Clifford Thomas Chapman FKC (23 May 1913 – 25 May 1982) was an Anglican priest.  He was the Dean of Exeter in the Church of England from 1973 to 1980.
Chapman was educated at Sir Walter St John’s School and King's College London. He was ordained in 1937 and began his ministry with curacies at  All Saints' Child’s Hill and  St Paul’s Winchmore Hill. After this he was the minister of the Church of Ascension Conventional District, Preston Road, Wembley and then the Rural Dean of Chelsea. From 1950 to 1961 he was the Rector of Abinger and from then until his appointment as the Dean of Exeter in 1973 he was a residentiary canon of Guildford Cathedral.

References

1913 births

1982 deaths

Deans of Exeter

People educated at Sir Walter St John's Grammar School For Boys

Alumni of King's College London
Fellows of King's College London